Hath may refer to:

Hat'h, an obsolete unit of length in India
Hath (Doctor Who), a Doctor Who alien
Hath (sport shooter) (born 1964), Laotian sports shooter
hath, an obsolete form of has; see English verbs